Bon Boatwright (born October 28, 1951) is a former American football defensive tackle. He played for the San Diego Chargers in 1974.

References

1951 births
Living people
American football defensive tackles
Oklahoma State Cowboys football players
San Diego Chargers players
Shreveport Steamer players